Changaroth  is a village in Kozhikode district in the state of Kerala, India.

Demographics
 India census, Changaroth had a population of 15760 with 7805 males and 7955 females.

Transportation
Changaroth connects to other parts of India through Koyilandy town.  The nearest airports are at Kannur and Kozhikode.  The nearest railway station is at Koyiandy.  The national highway no.66 passes through Koyilandy and the northern stretch connects to Mangalore, Goa and Mumbai.  The southern stretch connects to Cochin and Trivandrum.  The eastern National Highway No.54 going through Kuttiady connects to Mananthavady, Mysore and Bangalore.

References

Koyilandy area